The Battle of Sand Butte or the Thomas Massacre was a clash between the Modoc Indians and the United States 12th Infantry Regiment in the Modoc War. A small force of US troops were ambushed and nearly wiped out by Modoc warriors led by Scarface Charley. Ten days after the battle, the dead bodies of the soldiers were discovered by a patrol.

References 
 MHQ Summer 2011: Fooled Again by Peter E. Cozzens
 Indians of the Pacific Northwest: A History by Robert H. Ruby and John A. Brown

Sand Butte
Sand Butte
Native American history of California
Sand Butte
1873 in California
April 1873 events